Bielawa  is a village located in Poland, in Piaseczno County in the Masovian Voivodeship, just south of the city of Warsaw. The population is 960.

The Bielawski family originated from and owned the village of Bielawa in the 15th century through 17th century.

External links
Bielawa village in Konstancin-Jeziorna Urban-rural commune, Piaseczynski County, Mazovia Voivodship, Poland
American School of Warsaw in Bielawa
Bielawski Nobles
Bielawski Confirmation of Nobility

Bielawa